Sam's Diner, also known as Millie's Diner and Victory Diner, is a historic diner located at Kill Devil Hills, Dare County, North Carolina.  It was built about 1940 by the Kullman Dining Car Co., and moved to its present location in 1996.  It is a one-story, Streamline Moderne style steel frame building sheathed in porcelain enamel panels and stainless steel trim.

It was listed on the National Register of Historic Places in 1999.

As of 2019 the building houses a diner named the Kill Devil Grill.

References

Diners on the National Register of Historic Places
Diners in the United States
Commercial buildings on the National Register of Historic Places in North Carolina
Moderne architecture in North Carolina
Commercial buildings completed in 1940
Buildings and structures in Dare County, North Carolina
National Register of Historic Places in Dare County, North Carolina
Restaurants in North Carolina